The territory of Luxembourg has been ruled successively by counts, dukes and grand dukes. It was part of the medieval Kingdom of Germany, and later the Holy Roman Empire until it became a sovereign state in 1815.

Counts of Luxembourg

House of Ardenne–Luxembourg

House of Luxembourg–Namur

House of Hohenstaufen

House of Luxembourg–Namur

{| style="width:90%;" class="wikitable"
|-
! style="width:8%;"| Image
! style="width:15%;"| Name
! style="width:8%;"| Date of birth
! style="width:8%;"| Date of death
! style="width:8%;"| Reign
! style="width:8%;"| Relationship with predecessor
|-
| 
| style="text-align:center;"| Ermesinde
| style="text-align:center;"| July 1186
| style="text-align:center;"| 12 February 1247
| style="text-align:center;"| 1197–12 February 1247
| style="text-align:center;"| Henry IV's only daughter and Otto's fourth cousin|-
| 
| style="text-align:center;"| Theobald I
| style="text-align:center;"| 1158
| style="text-align:center;"| 13 February 1214
| style="text-align:center;"| 1197–13 February 1214
| style="text-align:center;"| her first husband and co-ruler
|-
| 
| style="text-align:center;"| Waleran
| style="text-align:center;"| 1180
| style="text-align:center;"| 2 July 1226
| style="text-align:center;"| May 1214–2 July 1226
| style="text-align:center;"| her second husband and co-ruler
|}

House of Luxembourg–Limburg

Dukes of Luxembourg
In 1354 the county was elevated to a duchy.

House of Luxembourg-Limburg

As Elisabeth had no surviving children, she sold Luxembourg to Philip III, Duke of Burgundy in 1441 but only to succeed upon her death. Philip captured the city of Luxembourg in 1443, but did not assume the ducal title because of conflicting claims by Anne of Austria, the closest Luxembourg relative.

Claimants

House of Valois-Burgundy

In 1467, when Elisabeth II of Austria, last rival claimant to the title, renounced her rights, Philip III's son, Charles, Duke of Burgundy, assumed the title of duke of Luxembourg, making it a subsidiary title of the Duke of Burgundy.

House of Habsburg

In 1482 Luxembourg passed to the House of Habsburg. After the abdication of Emperor Charles V, the duchy of Luxembourg fell to the Spanish line of the House of Habsburg.

During the War of Spanish Succession, 1701–1714, the duchy was disputed between Philip of Anjou, grandson of Louis XIV of France, of the House of Bourbon; and Charles of Austria, son of Leopold I, Holy Roman Emperor, of the House of Habsburg. In 1712 Luxembourg and Namur were ceded to Maximilian II Emanuel, Elector of Bavaria by his French allies, but at the end of the war in 1713 with the Treaty of Utrecht Maximilian Emanuel was restored as Elector of Bavaria. In 1713 the duchy fell to the Austrian branch of the House of Habsburg.

House of Bourbon

House of Wittelsbach

House of Habsburg

Luxembourg was occupied by French revolutionaries between 1794 and 1813. At the Vienna Congress, it was elevated to a grand duchy and given in personal union to William I of the Netherlands.

Grand Dukes of Luxembourg

The Grand Duke of Luxembourg (or Grand Duchess in the case of a female monarch) is the head of state of Luxembourg. Luxembourg is the world's only extant sovereign grand duchy, a status to which Luxembourg was promoted in 1815 upon its unification with the Netherlands under the House of Orange-Nassau.

The Luxembourg constitution defines the grand duke's position:

House of Orange-Nassau

House of Nassau-Weilburg
Under the 1783 Nassau Family Pact, those territories of the Nassau family in the Holy Roman Empire at the time of the Pact (Luxembourg and Nassau) were bound by semi-Salic law, which allowed inheritance by females or through the female line only upon extinction of male members of the dynasty. When William III died leaving only his daughter Wilhelmina as an heir, the crown of the Netherlands, not being bound by the family pact, passed to Wilhelmina. However, the crown of Luxembourg passed to a male of another branch of the House of Nassau: Adolphe, the dispossessed Duke of Nassau and head of the branch of Nassau-Weilburg.

In 1905, Grand Duke Adolphe's younger half-brother, Prince Nikolaus Wilhelm of Nassau, died, having left a son Georg Nikolaus, Count von Merenberg who was, however, the product of a morganatic marriage, and therefore not legally a member of the House of Nassau. In 1907, Adolphe's only son, William IV, Grand Duke of Luxembourg, obtained passage of a law confirming the right of his eldest daughter, Marie-Adélaïde, to succeed to the throne in virtue of the absence of any remaining dynastic males of the House of Nassau, as originally stipulated in the Nassau Family Pact. She became the grand duchy's first reigning female monarch upon her father's death in 1912, and upon her own abdication in 1919, was succeeded by her younger sister Charlotte, who married Felix of Bourbon-Parma, a prince of the former Duchy of Parma. Charlotte's descendants have since reigned as the continued dynasty of Nassau''.

Timeline of Grand Dukes of Luxembourg since 1815

See also
 Coat of arms of Luxembourg
 Duchy of Luxembourg
 Grand Ducal Family of Luxembourg
 History of Luxembourg
 Line of succession to the throne of Luxembourg
 List of consorts of Luxembourg
 List of prime ministers of Luxembourg

Footnotes

References

External links 
History of titles of the counts and dukes of Luxembourg based on contemporary documents (before 1467)
History of titles of the dukes of Luxembourg based on contemporary documents (1467-1795)
History of titles of the grand dukes of Luxembourg based on contemporary documents (since 1814)

 
 
 
Luxembourg
Luxembourg
Luxembourg
Luxembourg
Luxembourg
Monarchs

Monarchs of Luxembourg
House of Ardennes
Luxembourg

fr:Liste des comtes et ducs de Luxembourg